Peru Nation (PN) is a minor centre-right Peruvian political party.

History 
Founded in November 2015 by former congressman Francisco Diez Canseco Távara, the party initially participated in the 2016 general election, but withdrew its presidential ticket and congressional lists ten days before the election, amid the risk of failing to pass the electoral threshold.

At the legislative elections held on 26 January 2020, the party won 1.4% of the popular vote but no seats in the Congress of the Republic, placing 21st out of the 22 participating congressional lists.

It was confirmed that they would participate in the general elections of Peru in 2021, with which Francisco Diez Canseco Távara was running as presidential candidate, along with Nancy Cáceres and Manuel Salazar as vice presidents.

Election results

Presidential elections

Elections to the Congress of the Republic

Regional and municipal elections

References

2015 establishments in Peru
Christian democratic parties in South America
Conservative parties in Peru
Political parties established in 2015
Political parties in Peru